Again is the second studio album by the pop rock singer Oliver, released in 1970.

The song "Angelica" reached number 26 on the adult contemporary chart and number 97 on The Billboard Hot 100. "I Can Remember" reached number 24 on the adult contemporary chart. The album landed on the Billboard 200, reaching number 71.

Track listing 
 "The Twelfth of Never" (Jerry Livingston, Paul Francis Webster)
 "Comfort Me" (Oliver)
 "Young Birds Fly" (Oliver)
 "Until It's Time for You to Go" (Buffy Sainte-Marie)
 "Leaving on a Jet Plane" (John Denver)
 "I Can Remember" (Gary Illingworth, Myrna March, Richard Grasso)
 "The Picture Of Kathleen Dunne" (L. Russell Brown, Raymond Bloodworth)
 "Buddy" (Oliver)
 "If You Go Away" (Jacques Brel, Rod McKuen)
 "Angelica" (Barry Mann, Cynthia Weil)

Charts
Album

Singles

References

1970 albums